Vicenç Vilarrubla Solsona (born January 31, 1981 in la Seu d'Urgell) is a Catalan Spanish cross-country skier from Bellestar (Alt Urgell) who has competed in the World Cup since 2001. Vilarrubla competed in four FIS Nordic World Ski Championships from 2003 to 2009 and at 2006 and 2010 Winter Olympics. Vilarrubla's best Olympic results are 31st places in 30 km pursuit events in 2006 and 2010. His best World Championships result is a 27th place at the 15 km event in Oberstdorf in 2005, and his best World Cup result is a 17th place at a 15 km event in Changchun in 2007.

References
 

1981 births
Living people
People from La Seu d'Urgell
Sportspeople from the Province of Lleida
Cross-country skiers at the 2006 Winter Olympics
Cross-country skiers at the 2010 Winter Olympics
Olympic cross-country skiers of Spain
Spanish male cross-country skiers
Skiers from Catalonia